WCC Team is a professional cycling team which competes in elite road bicycle racing events such as the UCI Women's World Tour. The team was established in 2018 and controlled and ran by the UCI and World Cycling Centre as part of their aim to develop young cyclists from around the world.

Team roster

Major results
2018
Stage 2 The Princess Maha Chackri Sirindhorn's Cup "Women's Tour of Thailand", Nguyễn Thị Thật
Dwars door de Westhoek, Nguyễn Thị Thật
Stage 2 Vuelta a Colombia Femenina, Paula Patiño

2019
Stage 2 The Princess Maha Chackri Sirindhorn's Cup "Women's Tour of Thailand", Teniel Campbell
Ljubljana–Domžale–Ljubljana TT, Marlen Reusser
European Games, Time Trial, Marlen Reusser
Overall Tour de Belle Isle en Terre – Kreiz Breizh Elites Dames, Teniel Campbell
Stages 1 & 2, Teniel Campbell

Continental & National Champions
2018
 Asian Cycling Championships, Nguyễn Thị Thật

2019
 Switzerland Time Trial, Marlen Reusser
 Eritrea Time Trial, Desiet Kidane
 Ireland Road Race, Alice Sharpe
 Switzerland Road Race, Marlen Reusser

2020
 Slovakia Track (500m Time Trial), Tereza Medveďová
 Slovakia Track (Individual Pursuit), Tereza Medveďová
 Slovakia Time Trial, Tereza Medveďová
 Slovakia Road Race, Tereza Medveďová
 Barbados Time Trial, Amber Joseph
 Barbados Road Race, Amber Joseph

References

External links

UCI Women's Teams
Cycling teams established in 2018
Union Cycliste Internationale